Carla Ruth White (September 15, 1951 – May 9, 2007) was an American jazz vocalist.

Biography
White was born in Oakland, California, and raised in New York City, where she studied jazz dance. She began singing and acting in high school. She moved to London in 1969 to attend Webber-Douglas Academy of Dramatic Art. She returned to New York City and took music lessons intermittently during the 1970s with Lennie Tristano and Warne Marsh. In 1979 she met trumpet Manny Duran, who became her mentor. They formed the White-Duran Band and recorded the album Andruline for Stash. White died from cancer on May 9, 2007 in New York.

Discography
 Andruline with Manny Duran (Stash, 1984)
 Orient Express (Milestone, 1987)
 Mood Swings (Milestone, 1988)
 Listen Here (Evidence, 1995)
 Live at Vartan Jazz (Vartan Jazz 1998)
 The Sweetest Sounds (DIW, 2000)
 In Mexico (Jazz Cat, 2000)
 Can't Say Goodbye To Yesterday (Metal Gear Solid 2: Sons Of Liberty Original Soundtrack, 2001)
 A Voice in the Night (Bright Moon, 2006)

References

External links
AllaboutJazz Carla White Biography

1951 births
2007 deaths
20th-century American singers
20th-century American women singers
American women jazz singers
American jazz singers
Women jazz musicians
Deaths from cancer in New York (state)
DIW Records artists
Jazz musicians from California
Milestone Records artists
Singers from California
Video game musicians
21st-century American women